Neqareh Khaneh (also Romanized as Neqāreh Khāneh and Naqāreh Khāneh) is a village in Kabgian Rural District, Kabgian District, Dana County, Kohgiluyeh and Boyer-Ahmad Province, Iran. During the 2006 census, its population was 714 distributed in 159 families.

References 

Populated places in Dana County